Let's Talk is a half-hour English prime time entertainment talk show programme on Radio Televisyen Malaysia TV2 which ran for three seasons. The talk show garnered over one million viewers per episode with Alvin Anthons as its host for all three seasons. During the course of the programme, the show has had local and foreign celebrities, corporate and political figures, interesting professionals and sports personalities. Let's Talk aired every Thursday at 9:30pm on Radio Televisyen Malaysia TV2.

Production

Produced by KRU Motion Pictures Sdn Bhd, 'Let's Talk' is casual and fun, often leaves audiences entertained with either a song and dance, a fun demonstration or a mere impromptu comedy act. The program was recorded in front of live studio audience amidst a set that featured Alvin Anthons as the talk show host and two to three guests per episode. 

Topics discussed touches on issues pertaining to lifestyle, human interests, social and current interests. Featured guests included Datin Paduka Marina Mahathir, Anuar Zain, Chef Wan, Sheila Majid, Yasmin Yusoff, Paula Malai Ali.

Episodes

Season 1

Season 2

Season 3

References

2000s television talk shows
Radio Televisyen Malaysia original programming